Valley United FC was an American professional soccer club based in Phoenix, Arizona that played in the National Independent Soccer Association, in the 3rd tier of the US soccer pyramid, from 2022.

History
Valley United FC was founded in 2020 as Atletico Olympians FC and joined UPSL in the same year, as played in the Southwest Conference, Arizona Division. In the summer of 2021, the team also participated in 2021 NISA Independent Cup, as played in Southwest Region. In September 2021, the team announced they rebranded into the current name and then they joined NISA for the 2022 season. Valley United FC will be the first Latinos-owned National Independent Soccer Association club. The club will also take part for their first ever U.S. Open Cup for the 2022 edition. 

Valley United FC will be the third professional soccer team in Arizona alongside USL Championship side Phoenix Rising FC and USL1 club FC Tucson.

Valley United FC U23, the reserve team, currently plays in the Southwest Region of the NISA Nation, at the 4th tier of American soccer.

Ground

Valley United plays at the 2,500 seat Bell Bank Park in Mesa.

Players

Current roster

References

Soccer clubs in Arizona
Association football clubs established in 2020
National Independent Soccer Association teams
Sports in Phoenix, Arizona
2020 establishments in Arizona
United Premier Soccer League teams